Death-associated protein kinase 3 is an enzyme that in humans is encoded by the DAPK3 gene.

Function 

Death-associated protein kinase 3 (DAPK3) induces morphological changes in apoptosis when overexpressed in mammalian cells.  These results suggest that DAPK3 may play a role in the induction of apoptosis.

Unlike most other mammalian genes, murine (rat and mouse) DAPK3 has undergone accelerated evolution and diverged from the tightly conserved consensus that is maintained from fish to human.

Interactions 

DAPK3 has been shown to interact with PAWR and Death associated protein 6.

References

Further reading 

 
 
 
 
 
 
 
 
 
 
 
 
 

EC 2.7.11